Lima Gavabar (also Romanized as Līmā Gavābar; also known as Līmā Gūr) is a village in Eshkevar-e Sofla Rural District, Rahimabad District, Rudsar County, Gilan Province, Iran. At the 2006 census, its population was 63, in 26 families.

References 

Populated places in Rudsar County